Goonda Rajyam is a 1989 Indian Telugu-language action film directed by Kodi Ramakrishna, produced by G. Venkata Raju and G. Siva Raju for Sri Vijaya Lakshmi Art Productions starring Krishna Vijayashanti and Sarada. The film has musical score by Raj–Koti duo. The film was released on 2 March 1989 to positive reviews and emerged as a major commercial success.

Cast 
 Krishna as Raja
 Vijayashanti as Lata
 Sarada as Bhuvaneshwari Devi
 Nutan Prasad as Bhagwan Das
 Gollapudi Maruthi Rao as Bangaraiah
 Y. Vijaya
Murali Mohan as Muralinath
Prasad Babu as Sridhar
Giri Babu
Mallikarjuna Rao
M.V.S. Haranatha Rao as Shankarananda Swamy

Soundtrack 
Raj–Koti duo scored and composed the film's soundtrack comprising 5 tracks. Veturi Sundararama Murthy, C. Narayana Reddy and Jonnavithhula Ramalingeswara Rao penned the lyrics. 
 "Chakkani Gaajuluni" — S. P. Balasubrahmanyam., S. Janaki
 "Aa Neelikondallo" — S. P. B., S. Janaki
 "Nenera" — S. P. B.
 "Maguvala" — S. Janaki
 "Pilla Pilla Malle Mogga" — S. Janaki, S. P. B.

References

External links 
 Goonda Rajyam on Twitter

1980s Telugu-language films
1989 films
Indian action films
Films directed by Kodi Ramakrishna
Films scored by Raj–Koti
1989 action films